Shaw Tower or variation, may refer to:

 Shaw Tower (Vancouver), an office and residential complex in BC, Canada; regional HQ of Shaw Communications
 Shaw Monument, aka "Shaw Tower", in Preswick, South Ayrshire, Scotland
 Shaw Tower, Singapore, a building in Singapore of the Shaw Brothers company, see Shaw Organisation

See also
 Shaw (disambiguation)